Giorgos Papadopoulos  (Greek: Γιώργος Παπαδόπουλος; born 24 April 1991) is a Cypriot professional footballer who plays for Anorthosis. He plays as a goalkeeper.

References

External links

1991 births
Living people
Cypriot footballers
Cypriot First Division players
Ermis Aradippou FC players
Anagennisi Deryneia FC players
APEP FC players
PAEEK players
Anorthosis Famagusta F.C. players
People from Larnaca
Association football goalkeepers